Writing in childhood is the process of developing writing abilities during the early years of life, generally from infancy to adolescence. Writing in childhood encompasses the growth of writing abilities, including acquiring skills to write letters and words, comprehending grammar and sentence structure, and cultivating the capacity to communicate ideas and feelings through written language, which is very significant as it has an impact on academic achievement, social and emotional growth, and eventual professional accomplishments.  The benefits of writing with children for emergent literacy development. Children's experiences with writing and creating texts is an important avenue for self-expression in early childhood. These experiences also support precursors to their later reading and writing development

Four developmental stages 
Based on what have been discussed in the ontogenesis of writing in childhood and adolescence by Christie, F. (2010), the developmental stages for writing in children could be generally divided into four stages:

1. The emergent stage (6-8 years) 
The initial stage of writing in childhood is marked by early literacy skills like drawing and scribbling, which become more recognizable as writing as children enhance their fine motor abilities. It is widely regarded as the most crucial phase in developing children's writing skills because it gives them a fundamental understanding of writing and reading texts. During this stage, children begin to grasp the notion that writing represents language, and they test various ways of creating marks on paper to convey meaning.

2. The developing stage (7-9 years)  
This stage, also referred to as the transitional stage, is characterized by an increasing level of control over writing, including a more sophisticated understanding of grammar, spelling, and punctuation. Children at this stage begin to write more complex sentences and paragraphs, and they are able to communicate their ideas more effectively. They may also experiment with different writing styles and genres as they continue to refine their skills.

One of the key aspects of the developing stage is the increased focus on writing for different purposes and audiences. Children at this stage are encouraged to write in a variety of contexts, such as writing personal narratives, which helps them to develop a deeper understanding of the conventions of different genres and to become more adept at tailoring their writing to different audiences.

3. The consolidating stage (9-12 years) 
This stage marks a development in children's writing abilities where they produce more elaborate sentences and paragraphs, owing to their enhanced grasp of grammar and spelling. It is a critical stage because it involves possessing writing abilities and cultivating a more advanced writing style. Children who successfully advance through this stage are better equipped to tackle the requirements of academic writing and other types of written communication.

One important aspect of the developing stage is the emphasis on revising and editing. Children at this stage are encouraged to go back and review their writing, looking for ways to improve clarity, coherence, and effectiveness, and they may also receive feedback from teachers or peers, which helps them to develop a more critical thought.

4. The commanding stage (12-18 years) 
The final stage of the development of writing in childhood and adolescence is known as the commanding stage It is characterized by mature writing skills, including the ability to write for different purposes and audiences, to use a variety of writing styles and genres, and to revise and edit writing for clarity and effectiveness. At this stage, children have become confident and skilled writers, in control of the grammar and written language conventions, which allows them to use writing to achieve their goals and express their ideas with clarity and precision. This stage represents the culmination of years of developing writing skills and is a key indicator of a child's ability to communicate effectively through writing, preparing them for the demands of academic writing and other forms of written communication in adulthood..

Other kinds of learning in childhood

Learning handwriting 
Handwriting, defined as the ability to produce legible and quick writing by Dinehart, are closely related to writing in childhood, for developing handwriting skills in early childhood supports the advancement of some writing skills, such as reading and understanding of contextual cues, which might link to later academic success. 
 Support of development of reading skills
Research indicates that handwriting and reading share neural pathways and the cognitive processes involved in handwriting, such as letter formation and letter-sound relationships, are also involved in reading acquisition. Additionally, the physical act of writing helps children develop visual and spatial awareness, fine motor skills, and hand-eye coordination, which are also important for reading process. 
 Handwriting readiness and the likelihood of later academic success
Handwriting readiness refers to a child's preparedness for learning handwriting skills, which includes aspects such as cognitive, motor, and perceptual abilities. Research suggests that handwriting readiness is a significant predictor of academic success in later years, as it is related to overall school readiness and performance. For example, children who have difficulty with handwriting readiness in kindergarten are more likely to experience difficulties in literacy and math in later grades. Therefore, it is important for educators to provide opportunities for children to develop their handwriting skills and readiness in early childhood education.

Learning from adults 
As Rowe mentions in her article, children's writing skills in childhood are influenced by their interaction with adults, such as parents and caregivers, who expose them to language and literacy from a young age, and children learned intentionality through joint participation in writing with adults, with primarily focusing on five key patterns:

 The joint negotiation of textual intentions - Children and adults work together to establish a shared understanding of what they want to write and how they want to write it, and children learn to take on a more active role in this process as they gain experience and confidence, and this collaborative approach helps children to develop their writing skills and to see themselves as writers.
 Pedagogical mode of address - Adults play a crucial role in helping children to learn writing by using a specific pedagogical mode of address. This pattern involves speaking to children in a way that is clear, supportive, and structured, hence providing them with the guidance they need to understand the writing process and to develop their skills, and by mimicking this mode of address, adults help children to become more confident and independent writers.
 Use of existing resources to take up roles as writers - Children also learn writing by mimicking adults in their use of existing resources to take up roles as writers. Rowe's study found that children are particularly adept at using the physical tools of writing, like pencils and papers, to construct their own writing identities, and by mimicking adults in their use of these resources, children are able to develop their own writing skills and to see themselves as active participants in the writing process.
 Changes in participation - Children's participation in the writing process changes over time as they gain experience and confidence. Initially, children may be more passive in their participation, observing adults and mimicking their behavior. Nevertheless, as they gain more experience though the observation, they become more active participants in the writing process, making decisions about what to write and how to write it.
 Agency in shaping their participation as write - Children possess agency in shaping their participation as writers. In other words, they are not simply passive learners, but active participants who have their own ideas and perspectives. To be more specific, by mimicking adults and participating in the writing process, children are able to shape their own identities as writers and to develop their own unique writing styles.

Other impacts on children's learning in writing

Modern culture 
Anne Haas Dyson, the professor at the University of Illinois, mentions in her article about writing in childhood that while modern culture can provide new opportunities for communication and expression, it can also create challenges and barriers for children as they learn to write in traditional academic contexts. In other words, modern culture exerts impact on writing in children to some extent.

One of the main ways in which modern culture influences children's writing is through the media and popular culture.  Children nowadays are exposed to a wide range of media, including television, movies and the internet, which often use language and writing in ways that differ from traditional academic writing, and this exposure could affect the way children view writing as well as their motivations to engage in writing.

In addition, modern culture has also led to changes in the way children use language in their everyday lives. The use of technology and social media has resulted in new forms of communication, such as texting and instant messaging, which have their own unique language and writing conventions, and children who learn these forms of communication may struggle with the conventions of academic writing or may view them as irrelevant to their lives.

Furthermore, modern culture has led to changes in the way children view themselves as writers. The emphasis on standardized testing and academic performance has created pressure on children to produce writing that meets certain standards, which may limit their creativity and self-expression. In addition, the focus on correctness and accuracy in writing may cause children to view writing as a chore rather than a meaningful and enjoyable activity.

Genre 
Generally speaking, Kamberelis argues in his work, entitled 'Genre development and learning: Children writing stories, science reports, and poems', that children's writing is deeply influenced by the genres they encountered because genres can shape their understanding of what constitutes the good writing. Based on several researches conducted by Kamberelis regarding genre types and writing in childhood, they found that each genre have its unique characteristics that children need to learn in order to write effectively. For example, stories required children to develop characters, create a plot, and take the advantage of descriptive language to create a background setting; while poems requires them to focus on the imagination, metaphor, and other literary strategies in order to create a specific effect.

In addition to genre types, Kamberelis' studies also found that children's understanding of various genres can be affected by several factors, including from children's past experiences with reading and writing, cultural and social backgrounds, to teacher's expectations. For instance, children who are more familiar with a particular genre are likely to perform better when they are asked to writing that genre, while children who are not acquainted with it might face difficulties understanding its conventions and expectations, hence making it hard for them to compose in that genre.

References 

Childhood
Writing